Karen Toller (1662 – 13 August 1742) was a Norwegian estate owner and ship owner.

She was born in Tønsberg; the daughter of Niels Toller (c.1624–1676) and Kirsten Andersdatter Tonsberg, and a granddaughter of merchant and Mayor of Christiania Niels Toller (d. 1642) She was married to General Caspar Herman Hausmann. She inherited significant fortunes from both her parents, including sawmills, several farms and other properties, and was among the wealthiest women in Christiania. After the death of her husband she continued running the family's businesses. She also contributed to the establishment of a hospital for poor people in Christiania.

References

1662 births
1742 deaths
People from Tønsberg
17th-century Norwegian businesswomen
17th-century Norwegian businesspeople
18th-century Norwegian businesswomen
18th-century Norwegian businesspeople
Norwegian people of Danish descent
Ship owners